Émile Véron (26 March 1925 – 20 November 2013) was a French entrepreneur that created the model car brand Norev with his two brothers, Joseph and Paul, in 1946. The name of the company is his name spelled backwards.

He later created the toy company Majorette in 1961.

For his conduct he was awarded the National Order of the Legion of Honour, but 1992-1993 had judicial problems related to the failure of Majorette.

References

External links 
 Biography (french)
 interview on radio RTL

1925 births
2013 deaths
Businesspeople from Lyon